Television in Switzerland was introduced in 1950, with regular broadcasts commencing in 1953. People who live in Switzerland are required by law to pay a television licence fee, which is used to finance the public radio and television service SRG SSR. Since 1 January 2021, the Licence fee cost in all the linguistic regions of Switzerland is 355 CHF per year or 83.75 CHF quarterly (with a 2 CHF fee if paid via LSV+, Debit Direct, or e-billing, and the invoice is sent via email), counting both radio and television licences. All licence fee payers are entitled under the law to services of equal quality. The fee is charged per household and not per person, with empty dwellings being exempt. The fee is determined by the Federal Council.

History 
The history of television in Switzerland began in 1939 when the first test transmissions commenced. Regular transmissions started in 1953, at first only one hour a day for five days a week, and only in German: transmissions in French started in 1954 and in Italian only in 1958.

Romansh-speaking Swiss had to wait until 1963 for the first programme in their language, a full decade after regular television transmission were initiated.  To this day, there is no dedicated Romansh-language channel; instead the German and Italian channels air a few hours of Romansh programming per day.  The 1960s also saw the arrival of television advertising, in 1964, and of colour television, in 1968.

Télévision suisse romande broadcast their first evening programme in colour in 1968. 1968 was also the first year where more than one million Swiss households had a television.

In 1984, the Swiss teletext service, SWISS TXT, was started. In 1993 a fourth SRG SSR channel was created, first named "S Plus" but later renamed Schweiz 4 (Switzerland 4). However, this was short-lived: during its existence the channel constantly suffered low ratings and was hence shut down in 1997. In the same year, as a result, all the SRG SSR subsidiaries started a second channel, and SRF zwei, RTS Deux and RSI La 2 came into existence.

Analogue television was phased out starting July 2006, when TSI (now RSI) began the analogue switchoff. The process continued until January 2008, when the end of analogue broadcasting in Valais and Chablais completed the digital television transition in Switzerland.

In September 2018, SRG SSR announced that it would discontinue over-the-air broadcasting in DVB-T in 2019, citing costs, rather than implement DVB-T2. The services will remain available via encrypted free-to-view satellite, which offers all SRG SSR channels in high definition.

List of channels 
The following is a list of television channels broadcast in Switzerland:

German-speaking Switzerland 
Switzerland receives some domestic cable networks from Germany, which may involve the substitution of German advertising with domestic Swiss advertising by the local provider.

 SRF 1: the first of the three national German-language channels in Switzerland (the others being SRF zwei and SRF info). Run under the public SRG SSR broadcasting group. SRF 1 is considered to be the channel that airs more local programming, infotainment and other programmes of that nature.
 SRF zwei: Channel programming consists of sports, youth programmes, movies and a wide range of American prime time shows.
 SRF info: news channel owned by the public broadcasting group.
 3sat: public, advertising-free, television network run jointly by the public broadcasters of Germany, Austria and Switzerland. It is available off the ASTRA satellite to all of Europe and North Africa and West Asia.
 3+: Swiss general programming channel launched in 2006. Programming consists mainly of reality shows, infotainment and American fiction.
 4+: Swiss channel broadcasting since 2012.
 5+: Swiss channel broadcasting since 2014.
 TeleZüri: originally a local station in the city of Zurich, the channel now is available throughout the German-speaking part of the country. It airs the most viewed nightly newscast of all commercial channels in Switzerland.
 Sat.1 Schweiz: Swiss version of Sat.1. It differs from the latter in some local programming and regionalised advertising.
 ProSieben Schweiz: Swiss version of ProSieben. It differs from the latter in some local programming and regionalised advertising.
 S1 TV: Swiss channel geared towards an older audience launched in 2013. Programming consists mainly of documentaries and television drama.
 Star TV: cinema and lifestyle channel, with movies and programs about upcoming movies in theaters and in the home market, musical programs (mainly videoclips) and programs about videogames.
 joiz: youth-oriented channel, broadcasting magazines, music videos and live call-in shows, where viewers can participate mostly by means of social media.
 Viva Schweiz: Swiss version of Viva.
 Nickelodeon Schweiz: domestic sub-feed of Nickelodeon (Germany).
 Comedy Central Schweiz: domestic sub-feed of Comedy Central (Germany).
 Energy TV: music station, broadcasting back-to-back music videos.
 Sport Szene Fernsehen: sports channel, focusing on less popular sports.
 Schweiz 5: transmitted by cable, its programming is mostly made of call-in shows and infomercials.
 Teleclub: pay-TV company, operating several movie channels and a wide offer of live sports from Switzerland and abroad.
German channels available in Switzerland with local advertising: RTL, RTL II, Super RTL, Vox, Kabel 1, Sixx
Unlocalised German and Austrian channels available in Switzerland: all public and most commercial channels from the neighbouring countries are widely available in Switzerland through cable TV.

Most-viewed channels 
The channels with the largest viewing share in 2022 (1. Semester) are:

French-speaking Switzerland 
Switzerland receives some domestic cable networks from France, which may involve the substitution of French advertising with domestic Swiss advertising by the local provider.

 RTS Un: the first Swiss French language public television channel. Run under the public SRG SSR broadcasting group. RTS Un runs a general schedule with a focus on news and local programming.
 RTS Deux: The channel's programming is composed of reruns from the RTS Un television archive, children's television programs in the morning and early afternoon, teens programs in the late afternoon and evening and cultural programs or sports transmissions during prime time.
 RTS Info: virtual television channel, owned by Télévision Suisse Romande, and launched on 26 December 2006. It broadcasts 24 hours a day using an internet stream, and many times (especially in the night and the early morning) simulcasts on RTS Deux.
 Rouge TV: private musical channel, primarily aimed at the 15-34 demographics.
 TVM3: first private channel allowed to broadcast in the whole Romandy after the shutdown of Télécinéromandie. It began transmission on 1 May 2004.
 TV5MONDE: global television network, broadcasting several channels of French-language programming.
 TF1 Suisse: Swiss version of TF1. It differs from the latter only in the regionalised advertising.
 M6 Suisse: Swiss version of M6. It differs from the latter only in the regionalised advertising.
 W9 Suisse: Swiss version of W9. It differs from the latter only in the regionalised advertising.
 Cartoon Network (French TV channel)
 Disney Channel (French TV channel)
 Nickelodeon (French TV channel)
 Comedy Central (French TV channel)
Unlocalised French channels available in Switzerland: all public and most commercial channels from the neighbouring countries are widely available in Switzerland through cable TV.

Italian-speaking Switzerland 
Switzerland receives some domestic cable networks from Italy, which may involve the substitution of Italian advertising with domestic Swiss advertising by the local provider.

 RSI La 1: general television channel, broadcasting in Italian for the Italian-speaking Swiss in the whole country. Run under the public SRG SSR broadcasting group. Its programming is made of game shows, news programmes, movies, documentaries and less frequently sports programmes.
 RSI La 2: Sister channel of RSI La 1, broadcast in Italian. It mainly transmits sport programs, but also reruns and music programs. It does not broadcast any newscast.
 TeleTicino: commercial television channel focusing on news from the Italian-speaking part of the country.
Unlocalised Italian channels available in Switzerland: all public and most commercial channels from the neighbouring countries are widely available in Switzerland through cable TV.

Romansh-speaking Switzerland 
There is not a television channel broadcasting exclusively in Romansh language; instead, Radio Television Rumantscha's productions are transmitted on SRF 1, RSI La 2 and SRF info a few minutes a day. Programming includes Telesguard (a newscast), Cuntrasts and l'Istorgia da buna notg (bedtime story).

Regional channels 
Local radio and television networks in Switzerland are entitled to 4% of the licence fee every year (about 50,000,000 CHF for 2007). The number of subsidised television broadcasters is limited to 13, one for each designated coverage area. Also, the support share cannot exceed 50% of the operating costs of each network.
 TeleBärn: local television channel in German for the capital city of Berne and its surroundings.
 Telebasel: local television channel in German for the city of Basel.
 Tele M1: local television channel in German for the Mittelland region.
 TeleBielingue: simulcast in German and French for the city of Biel/Bienne.
 Tele 1: local television channel in German for the area of Lucerne.
 Tele Top: local television channel in German for the area of Winterthur.
 TVO: local television channel in German for the eastern part of Switzerland.
 Tele Südostschweiz: local television channel in German for the canton of Graubünden.
 Schaffhauser Fernsehen SHF: local television channel in German for the city of Schaffhausen.
 ZüriPlus: local television channel in German for the city of Zurich, an alternative to TeleZüri.
 Canal 9: local television channel in French for the canton of Valais.
 Canal Alpha: local television channel in French for the cantons of Neuchâtel and Jura.
 Léman Bleu:  local television channel in French for the city of Geneva.
 La Télé: local television channel in French for the cantons of Vaud and Fribourg.

Cable television 
A vast majority of the country is covered by cable networks; the major cable television operators is UPC Switzerland.

In 2007, the Federal Office of Communications (OFCOM) applied a must-carry regulation, requiring the local cable companies to transmit all the SRG SSR network stations and the following foreign channels: arte, 3sat, Euronews, TV5MONDE, ARD, ORF eins, France 2, Rai Uno.

International channels

All public and most commercial channels from the neighbouring countries are widely available in Switzerland through digital television services.

Notes and references

See also 
 Media in Switzerland
 SRG SSR

External links 
Swiss Federal Office for Telecommunications - Digital terrestrial television for Switzerland
Swiss Federal Office for Telecommunications - Index of Broadcasting Stations
SGR SSG Idée Suisse - Reception Maps (German, French or Italian only)